Moechotypa paraformosana is a species of beetle in the family Cerambycidae. It was described by Stephan von Breuning in 1979. It is known from Taiwan.

References

paraformosana
Beetles described in 1979